Bakit Kinagat ni Adan ang Mansanas ni Eba is a 1988 Filipino slapstick comedy film directed by Mike Relon Makiling and written by Arsenio 'Matanghari' Liao, partially inspired by the story of Adam and Eve.

Plot
The story revolves around Ambo (Dolphy), who portrays the typical middle-aged Filipino alpha male. All the women from the small town adore him, but he clearly shows no interest until he saw the woman of his dreams named Evelyn (Beverly Vergel). Ambo tries to court Evelyn, but winning her heart seems impossible. Eventually, Ambo succeeds but quickly discovers a downside to Evelyn – she refuses to have sex with Ambo for fear of becoming pregnant. After some shenanigans, they eventually get to consummate the marriage, but Ambo instead winds up becoming pregnant.

Cast
Dolphy as Ambo
Beverly Vergel as Evelyn
Panchito Alba as Tiago
Che-Che Sta. Ana as Tiago's daughter
Nova Villa as Luming
Eric Francisco as Eric
Fatima Alvir as Gigi
 Moody Diaz as Desta
Zorayda as Dory
Beverly Salviejo as Bronson
Whitney Tyson as Kekay Tyson
Rene Requiestas as Sacristan
Bert Mansueto as Wilmor
Babalu as Doctor
Conde Ubaldo as Father Conde
Bobby Zshornack as Justin
Lou Veloso as Snake
Miniong Alvarez as Guitarist
Flora Gasser as Nurse

Themes

The movie featured Filipino practices such as the Harana (serenade) and Panliligaw (courtship), and the popular Filipino serenade O Ilaw (Oh Light).

Production
Lita Santos (line producer)
Consolacion M. Yu (associate producer)
Maria N. Yu (associate producer)
JImmy C. Yu (associate producer)

References

External links

1988 films
1988 comedy films
Filipino-language films
1980s Tagalog-language films
Philippine comedy films
Films directed by Mike Relon Makiling